Berytoniscus is a monotypic genus of crustaceans belonging to the monotypic family Berytoniscidae. The only species is Berytoniscus singularis.

References

Isopoda
Monotypic crustacean genera